The National Field of Honour is a military cemetery for Canadian and Allied Veterans and their loved ones. It is located in Pointe-Claire, Quebec, Canada. It is operated by the Last Post Fund.

On June 8, 2007, the National Field of Honour was designated a National Historic Site of Canada.

History
The National Field of Honour was founded and is maintained by the Last Post Fund, a charitable organization founded by Arthur Hair in 1909.

The Last Post Fund's mission is to ensure that no Veteran is denied a dignified funeral and burial, as well as a military gravestone, due to insufficient funds at time of death. Its primary mandate is to deliver the Veterans Affairs Canada Funeral and Burial Program which provides funeral, burial and grave marking benefits for eligible Canadian and Allied Veterans. In addition to delivering the Funeral and Burial Program, the Last Post Fund supports other initiatives designed to honour the memory of Canadian and Allied Veterans.

The National Field of Honour was consecrated on September 21, 1930. As of 2010, more than 22,000 burials and interments have been made here. The National Field of Honour is distinct among Canadian military cemeteries in that all the headstones are laid flush with the ground. All Veterans whether they were Generals or Privates lie beside each other as equals. There are among them 16 war graves of World War II which are registered by the Commonwealth War Graves Commission.

The National Field of Honour is opened to visitors from Monday to Friday, 8am to 4pm, but anyone can come and stroll the grounds over the weekend.  As you stroll through the National Field of Honour, you will notice that each street is named to honour distinguished Canadian Veterans. There are also three commemorative circles which have been built to honour different war heroes. A new Columbarium has been added to the cemetery and Veterans' ashes can be placed into the Columbarium walls. A water garden has also been recently donated and in the summer you can sit beside the pond and examine beautiful flowers. There are benches all around the Field for visitors to relax and enjoy the landscape of history.

Memorials

The Gate of Remembrance

The entrance to the National Field of Honour is through the Gate of Remembrance, a medieval arch flanked by twin towers. The south tower houses an ecumenical chapel. The Gate was built in 1937 at a cost of $11,850, $5000 of which was donated by the city of Pointe-Claire, taking 13 weeks to complete. The Gate of Remembrance serves as a memorial to all those who made the supreme sacrifice for their country. It has served a number a purposes through the years once as the home of the groundskeep and for a time housed the Last Post Fund archives. The chapel was added in 1973, with funds given by former LPF director Bruce Brown. The architect of the Gate of Remembrance is Harold J. Doran and was built by Francis King. Harold J. Doran is often recognized as the architect of Benny Farm in NDG, built in 1946–47, a social housing project for World War II veterans.

Currie Circle

Currie Circle is dedicated to the memory of Sir Arthur Currie. Standing in the midst is the Cross of Remembrance. Sir Arthur commanded the Canadian Corps in World War I, and went on to serve as the principal and vice-chancellor of McGill University as well as president of the Last Post Fund from 1924 to 1932. He died in 1933 and is buried at Mount Royal Cemetery. On June 30, 1947 Last Post Fund Founder Arthur Hair was the first to be interred in the grounds surrounding the cross, which are reserved for the burial of Last Post Fund officials. This Plot is known as the Directors' Circle.

Arthur Hair Reception Center

This building is named after the founder of the Last Post Fund. It is now a reception and interpretive center where visitors can learn more about the Field and what the Veterans here have accomplished for their country. Names of all the soldiers are also kept here if you wish to find a relative.

The Flagstaff

An impressive 22-metre (73) foot metal flagstaff was a gift from a Canadian Steamship Line. It was erected by the Dominion Bridge Company in 1930.

The Commonwealth War Graves Memorial (The Quebec Memorial)

The Commonwealth War Graves Commission was established in England by Royal Charter in 1917, eight years after the inception of the Last Post Fund. Formed by Major General Sir Fabian Ware, it marks and maintains the graves of Commonwealth service personnel who were killed in action or died of other causes in the two World Wars, and builds memorials to those who have no known grave and keeps records and registers, including a record of the Civilian War Dead. These two like-minded organizations collaborated closely for many years to bring an end to grave recycling by cemeteries which reused old grave plots. Thanks to LPF and CWGC advocacy, this practice is no longer permitted in Québec.

The Quebec Memorial, consisting of two granite blocks, was erected to commemorate Canadian service personnel of both World Wars who were buried in Quebec Province but whose graves could no longer be marked or maintained.  It lists the names of 49 from World War I and 43 from World War II.

Air Force Memorial

This monument was donated in 2003 by Flight Lieutenant Howard Ripstein, a former director of the Québec Branch of the Last Post Fund. It is a metal propeller on a granite plinth, in memory of Veterans of the Canadian and Allied Air Forces.

Army Memorial

This is a pair of duel six-inch cannons in commemoration of the memory of Canadian and Allied soldiers who made the supreme sacrifice. It was donated by the Canadian Army in 1999.

Navy Memorial

An anchor dedicated to serve as a memorial for Canadian and Allied sailors. It was donated by the Canadian Forces' Longue Pointe Garrison in 1998.

De Salaberry Circle and Veterans' Memorial

This circle is named after Lieutenant Colonel Charles-Michel de Salaberry (1778–1829), the distinguished commander of the Canadian troops who halted the advance of invading American forces during the Battle of The Châteauguay on 26 October 1813, during the War of 1812. A French-Canadian nobleman, he served in the British Canadian army and commanded the troops in Lower Canada at the time.  In the midst of this circle stands the Veterans' Memorial, dedicated to the memory of all Canadian military men and women who died in World War I, World War II and the Korean War.

D'Urban Circle

This plot contains the oldest graves in the National Field of Honour, those of soldiers who fought in campaigns in Canada and around the world as long ago as the 18th century.  These include the Fenian Raids, the Napoleonic Wars, including the battle of Waterloo, and the War of 1812. These Veterans were originally interred at the Papineau Military Cemetery in downtown Montreal, which was used by British Forces from 1814 to 1869. That cemetery lay in the path now used by the access road for the Jacques Cartier Bridge.  Relocating the remains of some 1,797 burials prior to the construction of the bridge in 1944, and preserving the headstones, was the most formidable single project in the history of the Last Post Fund. The first burials had taken place 130 years earlier. Identifying those interred proved difficult because of the poor state of the records and deterioration of the headstones. Fortunately, in May 1944, Sydney Ham voluntarily transcribed all of the information from the headstones and through long, difficult research compiled a comprehensive roster of those buried in the Papineau Cemetery. The magnitude of his contribution to preserving the memory of these Veterans' contributions to Canadian history cannot be overstated. During a five-day period, all the remains were exhumed and, together with the headstones now surrounding the circle, were transferred to the National Field of Honour with dignity and full military honours.  The transfer was completed on July 21, 1944.

At the center of this circle stands an obelisk dedicated to Sir Benjamin D'Urban, commander of the British Forces in North America who died in Canada in 1849. This General and colonial administrator is chiefly remembered for his frontier policy as governor in the Cape Colony (now in South Africa, where the city of Durban is named in his honour). As a soldier, D'Urban began his service in 1793 and fought in the Napoleonic Wars where he won distinction in the Peninsular War as a quartermaster general. The obelisk is the National Field of Honour's largest monument. It was erected by his former comrades to mark his grave at the Papineau Military Cemetery and moved here when that cemetery relocated in 1944.

Jewish Section and Monument

This section of the National Field of Honour was consecrated in accordance with the tenets of the Jewish faith to permit Jewish veterans to be buried here. The monument is dedicated to the memory of Canadian and Allied Jewish Veterans who made the supreme sacrifice.

The Peace Circle

The Peace Circle was dedicated in 1997, after Canada changed its designation of Veterans to include those who had served on duty around the world in the service of peace. The Peace Monument was designed by the artist Jean Bernard, a World War II Royal Canadian Air Force Veteran. Atop a simple block of pink granite is perched a white dove which symbolizes peace. The words "Paix & Peace" are inscribed in the granite. This monument was funded by donation through Veterans Affairs Canada, the Royal Canadian Legion Quebec Command, the Montreal division of the Canadian Corps of Commissionaires and the ABN-AMRO Bank of Canada.

The Water Garden

The water garden was funded in part by the Ferguson Foundation, and it is intended to mirror the tranquillity of the Peace monument. By August the water lilies are beautifully blooming and benches are in place for visitors to enjoy the view.

The Columbarium

The Columbarium has been recently added to meet a growing need for Canadian Veterans and their spouses. This is being achieved with a twelve-unit Columbarium, offering a choice of over eight hundred exterior niches for cinerary urns. It is an impressive monument with benches for visitors to sit and relax.

Future Plans

There are plans for continuing development and expansion on this site. For 2011, plans have been drawn to build a new modernized Arthur Hair Reception centre to meet the growing demands of technology which have yet to be filled. Canada still has many veterans of the Second World War, Korean War and other actions their Armed Forces have participated in, and continue to participate in around the world today.

Notable burials

 Lieutenant Colonel Clarence S. Campbell OBE QC (1905–1984), president of the National Hockey League (1946–1977)
 Lieutenant-General Sir Benjamin d'Urban, GCB, KCH, KCTS
 Jack Gelineau BEM
 Private Leo Major DCM and Bar
 Lieutenant Colonel Coulson Norman Mitchell VC MC
 Air Vice Marshal Clifford McEwen

Bibliography
The Last Post Fund. History of the National Field of Honour.2011, http://www.lastpostfund.ca/EN/home.php.

Historic Sites and Monuments Board of Canada.  "List of Designations approved on June 8, 2007 by the Minister of the Environment". Historic Sites and Monuments Board of Canada. 2007-06-08. http://www.pc.gc.ca/clmhc-hsmbc/designation1a_e.asp. Retrieved 2009-03-16.

Durflinger, Serge. Lest We Forget. Montreal:Last Post Fund,2000.

Last Post Fund, QC Branch http://www.lastpostfund.ca/EN/foh.php 

The Last Post Fund, Memorial Chapel, http://www.lastpostfund.ca/EN/foh.php#Memorialchapel 

Durflinger, M, Serge. Lest We Forget. Montreal: Last Post Fund, 2000.

Clarkson, Ashley. Gate of Remembrance. The Last Post Fund, August, 2010. http://www.lastpostfund.ca/EN/documents/TheGateofRemembrance.pdf

Footnotes

External links
 Official site 

Cemeteries in Quebec
Buildings and structures in Pointe-Claire
National Historic Sites in Quebec
Canadian military memorials and cemeteries